Mark St. Laurent is an American bass-baritone and served on the Voice Faculty at New England Conservatory from 1989 to 2013. He has sung extensively in oratorio and opera, both in the United States and Europe. He has appeared as a soloist at the Aspen Music Festival, Bach Aria Festival, Boston Lyric Opera, Lake George Opera, Monadnock Music, Indian Hill Symphony, and the Liederkranz Foundation. His past opera performances have included La Bohème, Madame Butterfly, Die Zauberflöte, Don Giovanni, The Barber of Seville, and The Elixir of Love.

He holds a Bachelor of Music degree and a Master of Music degree from Indiana University.

Sources
New England Conservatory, Staff biography

American opera singers
Operatic bass-baritones
Indiana University alumni
Living people
Year of birth missing (living people)